Haechi may refer to:

 Xiezhi, a legendary creature in Chinese and Korean mythology and Seoul mascot
 Haechi (TV series), a 2019 South Korean television series
 Haechi (comics), a character in Marvel Comics